Owens Whitney School District 6 a.k.a. Owens School District No. 6 is a public school district based in Mohave County, Arizona.

The district includes Wikieup and sections of the Hualapai Indian Reservation.

For senior high school, students may choose between the Bagdad Unified School District or the Kingman Unified School District.

History
In 1984, the district had 44 students and four teachers, with one of them also being the principal. That year the district had proposed having a four day school week to save money, and the Arizona Board of Education approved the proposal. It would begin in fall 1984. In 1987 all members of the state board decided that Owens-Whitney could continue having four days per week instruction.

Student body

References

External links
 
 

School districts in Mohave County, Arizona
Public K–8 schools in Arizona